Md. Tofazzal Islam (born December 20, 1966) is a biotechnologist, ecological chemist, educator, and author from Bangladesh. He is now a professor and founder Director of Institute of Biotechnology and Genetic Engineering (IBGE) of Bangabandhu Sheikh Mujibur Rahman Agricultural University (BSMRAU), Gazipur. He joined Bangladesh Open University (BOU) as a lecturer in 1994 and became an assistant, associate and full professor in 1997, 2004 and 2010, respectively. He joined BSMRAU on July 1, 2010, as a professor and head of the Department of Biotechnology. He is a founding Director (2019-2021) of Institute of Biotechnology and Genetic Engineering (IBGE) of BSMRAU, Bangladesh.

Early life and education

Islam was born in 1966 in Shashai village of Brahmanbaria District in East Pakistan (now Bangladesh). His father, Bazlur Rahman, is a farmer and mother, Khaleda Khanom is a house wife. He witnessed the atrocities of Pakistani armies during liberation war of Bangladesh in 1971, which delayed starting of his primary education.  He started his primary education from Grade 2 at a newly established a primary school at Shashai. As the elder son, during his primary and secondary education, he participated with his parents for maintaining the family from production of crops. He was a meritorious student in his schools and never stood second from Grade 2–10. He passed SSC and HSC from Satbarga High School and Brahmanbaria Government College, respectively securing First Division in both cases.

Islam obtained B Sc Ag (Hon) and M Sc (Ag) degrees from the Bangladesh Agricultural University (BAU), securing First Position in the First Class in both the cases in order of merit. He went to Japan as a Japanese government scholar and did MS (1999) and PhD (2002) at Hokkaido University with distinction. Islam did Post-doc as an Alexander von Humboldt fellow (2007-2009) at University of Goettingen, Germany with Andreas von Tiedemann in the Division of Plant Pathology and Plant Protection. He has been awarded the Commonwealth Academic Staff Fellowship (March to May 2013) to work with Prof. Michele L. Clarke at the University of Nottingham, UK. He worked with Prof. Satoshi Tahara of Hokkaido University and Prof. Shinya Oba of Gifu University, Japan as a JSPS Postdoctoral (2003-2005) and JSPS Invitation Fellow (June–July 2015), respectively. He has also been awarded the prestigious US Fulbright Visiting Fellowship (September 2017 to June 2018) to work on development of a convenient molecular tool for diagnosing anthracnose diseases in asymptomatic strawberry plants with Prof. Daniel Panaccione at West Virginia University.

Personal life

Islam married Hasna Hena Begum in 1995. She is currently serving as the Senior Specialist (Soil and Environment) of the Waste Concern, Bangladesh. They have one son - Tahsin Islam Sakif who was born on July 2, 1997. Hasna Hena did her Ph.D. in plant physiology at Hokkaido University in 2003.

Research accomplishments

Islam has been working on ecological chemistry of Peronosporomycete phytopathogens and applied phytochemistry since 1997. His MS and PhD theses were involved in understanding cell biology of flagellar motility, taxis, viability and differentiation of zoospores of the oomycete phytopathogens when interacting with host and nonhost plant secondary metabolites. He elucidated mechanisms of damping-off disease control in spinach and sugar beet by Lysobacter sp. SB-K88. He has awarded a fellowship (2003–2005) from the Japan Society for the Promotion of Science (JSPS) to work on ‘signaling systems between root and rhizoplane microorganisms including oomycetes and their agricultural usage’ at the said laboratory of Hokkaido University.

Islam published more than 250 research papers in national and international peer-reviewed journals and books series, more than 200 articles in national dailies and periodicals, seven books. Most of his fundamental research contributions have been published in some world-leading international journals and reviews such as -

Molecular Plant-Microbe Interactions, Applied and Environmental Microbiology, Cell Motility and the Cytoskeleton, Journal of Agricultural and Food Chemistry, Phytochemistry, Phytopathology, Plant and Soil, Biological Control, European Journal of Plant Pathology, Bioscience, Biotechnology, and Biochemistry, Journal of Pesticide Science, Journal of Basic Microbiology, World Journal of Microbiology and Biotechnology, The Journal of Antibiotics, Journal of General Plant Pathology and so on.

His one of the pioneer researchers in open and distance learning (ODL) in Bangladesh. As the founder teacher, he significantly contributed to the establishment of School of Agriculture and Rural Development at Bangladesh Open University. His research book titled "Information and Communication Technology in Education" published by Paragon Enterprises Ltd. in Bangla language has been well accepted by readers and elites. Recently, he co-edited a book Effectively Implementing Information Communication Technology in Higher Education in the Asia-Pacific Region with Jim Peterson, Okhwa Lee, and Matthew Piscioneri. He presented research findings and chaired sessions in many international conferences/symposia in the US, UK, Germany, Japan, Italy, Netherlands, Malaysia, China, Nepal, India, and Jamaica.

Islam worked as an Alexander von Humboldt fellow (2007–2009) at Georg-August-Universität Göttingen, Germany with Andreas von Tiedemann in the Division of Plant Pathology and Plant Protection. His research interests are concentrated in understanding the underlying molecular mechanism of asexual sporulation in peronosporomycetes and signal transduction pathways of chemotaxis and differentiation of zoospores. He has made outstanding leadership in addressing rapid wheat blast outbreak in Bangladesh in 2016. Since wheat blast first emerged in Bangladesh, the genetic identity and origin of wheat blast fungus was detected by an international collaborative team, Islam from Bangladesh led this team. His research findings on molecular biological studies on wheat blast fungus published in BMC Biology 2016 and mitigation of the fearsome wheat blast disease by development of blast resistant wheat varieties are ongoing projects. In addition, he has been collaborating with Prof. Yusuke Yamauchi and Shahriar Hossain of Wollongong University in Australia to utilize nanotechnology for production of high valued products from jute fiber, development of nanopesticide and preparation of agriculturally and environmentally valuable mesoporous nanomaterials. Their fruitful collaboration already produced an outstanding publications in Nature Communication 2017. 
Islam is an internationally reputed molecular biologist and biotechnologist. A notable contribution of Islam was the determination of genetic identity and the origin of the first outbreak of fearsome wheat blast fungus in Bangladesh in 2016, which devastated 15,000 hectares of wheat with yield losses up to 100%. In that national crisis, Islam led 31 researchers from 7 countries of 4 continents and determined the origin of the wheat blast disease in Bangladesh within weeks as a lineage of South American Magnaporthe oryzae using field pathogenomics, open data sharing and open science approaches. In collaboration with international partners, his team invented a rapid, convenient, specific and cost-effective method for the detection of wheat blast fungus M. oryzae Triticum pathotype using genome-specific primers and Cas12a-mediated technology. He has also developed blast resistant wheat varieties using CRISPR-Cas9 genome editing and also molecular breeding through introgression of two blast resistant genes to native varieties. Islam has made outstanding contributions to expand our standing how a phytopathogen specifically locates its host and the proceed to infection mediated by the host-specific signaling compound(s). He discovered the activity and mode of actions of many bioactive secondary metabolites that inhibit motility of zoospores with potential for controlling 50 bioactive natural products from plants and microorganisms that already published in world reputed high ranked journals.(ii) discovery of probiotic bacteria (more than 650) from crop plants (endophytes) that promote plant growth and suppress diseases in host plants (Rahman et al. 2018, Scientific Reports, 2018, 8:2504; Islam et al. 2016, Frontiers Microbiol., 7:851); (iii) elucidation of involvement of protein kinase C and enhanced ATPase activity in mitochondria in zoosporogenesis and motility of zoospores (Islam et al., 2011, Mol. Plant-Microbe Interact. 24:38–947; Islam et al. 2016, Front. Microbiol. 7:1824); (iv) roles of dynamic rearrangement of F-actin and G protein-coupled receptor in chemotaxis and differentiation of zoospores by host-specific signals (Islam et al., 2003, Plant Soil, 101:131-142; Islam, 2008, Cell Mot. Cytoskel., 65:553–562); (v) biological control of zoosporic oomycetes (Islam, 2008 Biol. Contr., 46: 312–321); and (vi) molecular identification of multiple antibiotic resistant fish pathogenic Enterococcus faecalis and their control (Scientific Reports 2017, 7, 3747).

Islam's contributions have been published in many international journals (>250 peer-reviewed articles, >25 book chapters). He secured more 2 million dollars of funding from World Bank, USDA, British Council (UK), BBSRC, Bangladesh Academy Science – USDA, University Grants Commission of Bangladesh etc. and established laboratories equipped with cutting-edge research in the field of biotechnology and genetic engineering at his newly established IBGE.

In 2021, Islam has elected as class of Fellow of The World Academy of Science (TWAS) for the advancement of science. He is also an elected Fellow of the Bangladesh Academy of Sciences (FBAS). He was awarded many prizes and medals for his outstanding academic and research accomplishments in interdisciplinary research in the field of biotechnology. His notable awards include Commonwealth Innovation Award 2019, Rotary International Vocational Excellence Award 2017, Bangladesh Academy of Science Gold Medal & Award 2011 in Biological Sciences (Senior Group), Food & Agriculture Award 2011 from Oxfam, CSRL and GROW, University Grants Commission (UGC) Bangladesh Awards in 2004 and 2008, the Best Young Scientist Award 2003 from the Japan Society for Bioscience, Biotechnology and Agrochemistry (JSBBA), Chancellor's Prize in 1995 and a gold medal in 2003 from BAU. He organized sessions, presented research findings and chaired sessions in many national and international conferences/symposia in the US, the UK, Germany, Japan, Italy, Netherlands, Hong Kong, Norway, Malaysia, China, South Korea, Fiji, and Jamaica. He served as an international consultant in many organizations including Secretariat of the Pacific Community (SPC) in the 22 Pacific Countries & Territories.

Islam is the chief editor of Springer's two-book series Bacillus and Agrobiotechnology (from 2017) and CRISPR-Cas Methods (from 2020). He is an academic editor of PLOS One and some other journals. He is a member of many national and international professional organizations including AAAS (USA), ASM (USA), APS (USA), National Core Committee for Biotechnology and so on.

Area of specialization and research interests
 Genomics and genome editing for blast resistance in wheat 
 Molecular Plant-Oomycte Interaction
 Applied and Environmental Microbiology
 Ecological Chemistry
 Plant probiotics and their usage as biofertilizers and biopesticides

Administrative, academic and other position (leadership)

 Fellow, The World Academy of Sciences (TWAS)
 Director, Institute of Biotechnology and Genetic Engineering (IBGE), BSMRAU from April 2019 to date.
 Director (International Affairs), BSMR Agric University, Bangladesh from July 2017 to November 2017.
 Fellow, Bangladesh Academy of Sciences, the apex body of the eminent scientists and technologists of Bangladesh.
 Founder Director, Institute of Biotechnology and Genetic Engineering (IBGE), BSMRAU from 15 April 2019 to date.
 Member, Board of Governors (BOG, highest authority of BOU), Bangladesh Open University (BOU), 1997–98.
 Member, Academic Council (2010), BOU.
 Dean (in charge), School of Agriculture and Rural Development, BOU in 1996.
 Vice-president (elected), Shaheed Nazmul Ahsan Hall Sangsad (1991–92), BAU.
 General Secretary, Executive Committee of Bangladesh Open University Teachers Association (BOUTA), 1995–96.
 Member, Bangladesh Federation of University Teachers Association in 1995–96.
 Member, Executive Committee of BOUTA in 1996–97, 2002–03, 2010–11.
 Head (July 2010 to July 2012), Department of Biotechnology, BSMRAU, Gazipur, Bangladesh.
 Member (July 2010 to date), Academic Council, BSMRAU, Gazipur, Bangladesh.
 Member (July 2010 to date), Academic Council, Hajee Mohammad Danesh Science & Technology University, Bangladesh.
 Member (October 2010 to date), Executive Committee, School of Life Science, Shahjalal University of Science and Technology, Sylhet, Bangladesh.
 Director (July 2012 to date), Outreach Program, Bangabandhu Sheikh Mujibur Rahman Agricultural University (BSMRAU), Gazipur, Bangladesh
 Syndicate Member, Sylhet Agricultural University (SAU), Sylhet, Bangladesh

Award and prizes 
 Commonwealth Innovation Award, Commonwealth Secretariat, UK in 2019
 Islamic Development Bank Transformers Roadshow Competition Prize 2018
 Fulbright Visiting Scholar Fellowship from 2017 to 2018 in USA
 Vocational Excellence Award 2017 for Outstanding Contribution to Science and Technology from the Rotary Club of Uttara (RI Dist 3281), Bangladesh.
 Abdul Mannan Memorial Award 2017 from the Hafiza Khatun Memorial Trust.
 The “Genius Award 2016” from the Bangladesh Education Observation Society, Bangladesh.
 Food and Agriculture Award 2011 from CSRL (campaign for sustainable livelihoods), Oxfam and GROW for outstanding contribution to agriculture.
 University Grants Commission (UGC) Award 2008 for the second time (award received in May 2011) for outstanding fundamental research discoveries in Agricultural Sciences.
 Georg Forster Research Award and Fellowship from the Alexander von Humboldt Foundation, Germany (2007-2009)
 UGC Research Award 2004 from the University Grants Commission (UGC), Dhaka, Bangladesh for fundamental research accomplishments in agricultural science.
 Japan Society for Bioscience, Biotechnology, and Agrochemistry (JSBBA) Best Young Scientist Award 2003 for significant research discovery in Ecochemical Interactions between Plants and Phytopathogenic Peronosporomycetes.
 JSPS Foreign Researcher Fellowship for Postdoctoral Research at Hokkaido University from April 2003 to March 2005
 Monbukagakusho Scholarship for MS and Ph D Study at Hokkaido University (1997–2002).
 Gold Medal from the Honorable President of Bangladesh and the Chancellor of BAU Prof. Iazuddin Ahmed for securing first position in M.Sc. (Ag.) among all students in all the department of the Faculty of Agriculture with more than 75% marks in 1989 (held in 1995).
 BAU Chancellor's Prize from the Honorable Prime Minister Begum Khaleda Zia for securing First Position in the First Class in B.Sc. Ag. (Hons.) in 1988 (held in 1991).
 Prof. Karim Memorial Award in 1992.
 University Grants Commission Merit Scholarship in 1990.
 Commonwealth Academic Fellowship of UK in 2012
 Bangladesh Academy of Sciences Gold Medal 2011

Live Interview
 https://www.youtube.com/watch?v=zt3EaaP1kLk&fb_action_ids=10202883147300821&fb_action_types=yt-fb-app%3Aupload&fb_source=other_multiline&action_object_map
 https://www.youtube.com/watch?v=W6Qt_Srw7MA&fb_action_ids=10202882145315772&fb_action_types=yt-fb-app%3Aupload_ne
 https://www.youtube.com/watch?v=nLXBM6QyKz0&fb_action_ids=10202884699859634&fb_action_types=yt-fb-app%3Aupload_ne

Selected works
Islam published more than 150 research papers in national and international peer-reviewed journals and books series, more than 150 articles in national dailies and periodicals, seven books. Most of his fundamental research contributions have been published in some world-leading international journals and reviews such as -Nature Communications, Scientific Reports, BMC Biology, ACS Sustainable Chemistry and Engineering, PLOS ONE, Journal of Materials Chemistry A, Journal of Natural Products Chemistry,  Molecular Plant-Microbe Interactions, Applied and Environmental Microbiology, Cell Motility and the Cytoskeleton, Journal of Agricultural and Food Chemistry, Phytochemistry, Phytopathology, Plant and Soil, Biological Control, European Journal of Plant Pathology, Bioscience, Biotechnology, and Biochemistry, Journal of Pesticide Science, Journal of Basic Microbiology, World Journal of Microbiology and Biotechnology, The Journal of Antibiotics, Journal of General Plant Pathology, Journal of Basic Microbiology and so on.

1.	Plant probiotic bacteria Bacillus and Paraburkholderia improve growth, yield and content of antioxidants in strawberry fruit. Mosaddiqur Rahman, Abdullah As Sabir, Julakha Akter Mukta, Md. Mohibul Alam Khan, Mohammad Mohi-Ud-Di, Md. Gishuddin Miah, Mahfuzur Rahman, Md Tofazza Islam. Scientific Reports (2018) 8:2504.

2.	Application of CRISPR/Cas9 Genome Editing Technology for the Improvement of Crops Cultivated in Tropical Climates: Recent Progress, Prospects, and Challenges. Haque E, Taniguchi H, Hassan MM, Bhowmik P, Karim MR, Smiech M, Zhao K, Rahman M and Islam T (2018) Front. Plant Sci. (2018) 9:617.

3.	Enhancement of Growth and Grain Yield of Rice in Nutrient Deficient Soils by Rice Probiotic Bacteria. Khan MMA, Haque E, Paul NC, Khaleque MA, Al-Garni SMS, Islam MT. Rice Science (2017) 24(5): 264-273.

4.	Mesoporous metallic rhodium nanoparticles. Bo Jiang, Cuiling Li, Omer Dag, Hideki Abe, Toshiaki Takei, Tsubasa Imai, Md. Shahriar A. Hossain, Md. Tofazzal Islam, Kathleen Wood, Joel Henzie & Yusuke Yamauchi. Nature Communications (2017) 8:15581.

5.	Molecular Identification of Multiple Antibiotic Resistant Fish Pathogenic Enterococcus faecalis and their Control by Medicinal Herbs. Muntasir Rahman, Md. Mahbubur Rahman, Suzan Chandra Deb, Md. Shahanoor Alam, Md. Jahangir Alam & Md. Tofazzal Islam. Scientific Reports (2017) 7, Article number: 3747.

6.	Bacilli and Agrobiotechnology. Islam MT, Rahman M, Piyush P and Aeron A. (2017) An edited series book published by Springer International Publishing,  (Print) 978-3-319-44409-3 (Online). pp. 416.

7.	Emergence of wheat blast in Bangladesh was caused by a South American lineage of Magnaporthe oryzae. M. Tofazzal Islam, Daniel Croll, Pierre Gladieux, Darren M. Soanes, Antoine Persoons, Pallab Bhattacharjee, Md. Shaid Hossain, Dipali Rani Gupta, Md. Mahbubur Rahman, M. Golam Mahboob, Nicola Cook, Moin U. Salam, Musrat Zahan Surovy, Vanessa Bueno Sancho, João Leodato Nunes Maciel, Antonio NhaniJúnior, Vanina Lilián Castroagudín, Juliana T. de Assis Reges, Paulo Cezar Ceresini, Sebastien Ravel, Ronny Kellner, Elisabeth Fournier, Didier Tharreau, Marc-Henri Lebrun, Bruce A. McDonald, Timothy Stitt, Daniel Swan, Nicholas J. Talbot, Diane G. O. Saunders, Joe Win and Sophien Kamoun. BMC Biology (2016) 14:84

8.	Inhibitory effects of macrotetrolides from Streptomyces spp. on zoosporogenesis and motility of peronosporomycete zoospores are likely linked with enhanced ATPase activity in mitochondria. Islam MT et al. 2016. Frontiers in Microbiology 7: 1824.

9.	Protein kinase C is likely to be involved in zoosporogenesis and maintenance of flagellar motility in the Peronosporomycete zoospores. M. T. Islam, A. von Tiedemann, H. Laatsch. Molecular Plant-Microbe Interactions (2011) 24: 938-947.

10.	Dynamic rearrangement of F-actin organization triggered by host-specific plant signal is linked to morphogenesis of Aphanomyces cochlioides zoospores. M. T. Islam. Cell Mot. Cytoskel. (2008) 65: 553-562.

11.	Disruption of ultrastructure and cytoskeletal network is involved with biocontrol of damping-off pathogen Aphanomyces cochlioides by Lysobacter sp. strain SB-K88. M. T. Islam (2008) Biol. Contr. 46: 312-321.

12.	Suppression of damping-off disease in host plants by the rhizoplane bacterium Lysobacter sp. strain SB-K88 is linked to plant colonization and antibiosis against soilborne Peronosporomycetes. M. T. Islam, Y. Hashidoko, A. Deora, T. Ito, S. Tahara (2005) Appl. Environ. Microbiol. 71: 3786-3796.

13.	Host-specific plant signal and G-protein activator, mastoparan, triggers differentiation of zoospores of the phytopathogenic oomycete Aphanomyces cochlioides. M. T. Islam, T. Ito, S. Tahara. Plant Soil  (2003) 255: 131-142.

14.	Zoosporicidal activity of polyflavonoid tannin identified in Lannea coromandelica stem bark against phytopathogenic oomycete Aphanomyces cochlioides. M. T. Islam, T. Ito, M. Sakasai, S. Tahara. J. Agric. Food Chem. (2002) 50: 6697-6703.

15.	Dihydroflavonols from Lannea coromandelica. M. T. Islam, S. Tahara. Phytochemistry (2000) 54: 901-907.

16.	CRISPR-Cas Methods. Islam, M. Tofazzal, Bhowmik, Pankaj, Molla, Kutubuddin A. (Eds.). doi. 10.1007/978-1-0716-0616-2.

Notable contributions

 Invented a rapid, convenient, specific and cost-effective molecular diagnostic method for detection of wheat blast fungus genome-specific primers and Cas12a-mediated technology.
 Discovered origin and genetic identity of the first emergence of devastating wheat blast disease in Bangladesh in 2016 using field pathogenomics and open data sharing approaches. 
 Discovered more than 50 new bioactive natural products and elucidated their modes of action.
 Established the Institute of Biotechnology and Genetic Engineering (IBGE) in 2019 at BSMRAU.
 Secured approx. USD 2 million funds from national and international donors, and established laboratories with state-of-art facilities and developed a Dream Team in the IBGE of BSMRAU.
 Developed novel plant probiotic formulation that reduce 50% requirement of chemical fertilizers in rice.
 Developed a strong national and international collaboration to address emerging challenges in agriculture by cutting-edge research (e.g., genomics, genome editing etc.)

Notable publications
ORCID
Total 250+; Citation 3870+, h-index 34; i10-index 89; Patent 1; Researchgate Score 43.22 (on April, 2021)
Complete curriculum vitae in English and in Bengali

 Rapid detection of wheat blast pathogen Magnaporthe Oryzae Triticum pathotype using genome-specific primers and Cas12a-mediated technology. Engineering
 Biological and biorational management of blast diseases in cereals caused by Magnaporthe oryzae. Critical Reviews in Biotechnology (in-press).
 Choice of assemblers has a critical impact on de novo assembly of SARS-CoV-2 genome and characterizing variants.
 Fabrication of highly and poorly oxidized silver oxide/silver/tin(IV) oxide nanocomposites and their comparative anti-pathogenic properties towards hazardous food pathogens
 Mobilizing Crop Biodiversity
 Plant health emergencies demand open science: Tackling a cereal killer on the run
 Mesoporous metallic rhodium nanoparticles

References

Academic staff of Bangladesh Open University
Living people
20th-century chemists
21st-century chemists
1966 births
Bangladeshi phytopathologists